The 2016–17 Greek A1 Ethniki was the 35th season of the A1 Ethniki, Greece's premier handball women's league. It ran from 10 October 2016 to 12 May 2017.

Teams

A total of 10 teams participated in this year's edition of the Women's A1 Ethniki. Of these, 6 sides qualified directly from the 2015–16 season, while 4 sides qualified from the A2 Ethniki play-offs: Panetolikos, Arion Ptolemaida, Honda Panorama and Filippos Veria.

Regular season

League table

Results

Finals 
In the finals, teams playing against each other have to win three games to win the series. Thus, if one team wins three games before all five games have been played, the remaining games are omitted. The team that finished in the higher championship play-off place, is going to play the first, second and fifth (if necessary) game of the series at home.

Source: Hellenic Handball Federation

References

External links
Official website 

Handball in Greece
2016–17 domestic handball leagues
2016 in Greek women's sport
2017 in Greek women's sport